Lapta Türk Birliği Spor Kulübü is a Turkish Cypriot football club based in Lapta. It was founded in 1956.

Colors
The club colors are green and red.

References

External links 

 

Association football clubs established in 1956
Football clubs in Northern Cyprus
1956 establishments in Cyprus